John Jay Hall is a 15-story building located on the southeastern extremity of the Morningside Heights campus of Columbia University in New York City, on the northwestern corner of 114th St. and Amsterdam Avenue. Named for Founding Father, The Federalist Papers author, diplomat, and first Chief Justice of the United States Supreme Court John Jay (Class of 1764), it was among the last buildings designed by the architectural firm of McKim, Mead & White, which had provided Columbia's original Morningside Heights campus plan, and was finished in 1927.

The building includes freshman housing for students of Columbia College and the Fu Foundation School of Engineering and Applied Science; John Jay Dining Hall, the university's primary undergraduate dining facility; JJ's Place, an underground student quick service restaurant; the university's health services center; and an elegant wood-paneled lounge. Among its most prominent residents was the Spanish poet Federico García Lorca.

Unlike Carman Hall, the other exclusively freshman dormitory at Columbia, in which rooms are double-occupancy and arranged in clusters of two around a common bathroom as a suite, John Jay Hall's accommodations consist primarily of single rooms along narrow corridors, generally with three double-occupancy rooms per floor. Other dormitories housing undergraduate freshmen (but not exclusively so) include Wallach Hall, Hartley Hall, and Furnald Hall.

History

"Skyscraper Dorm"

Following the First World War, significantly expanded enrollment at Columbia, combined with skyrocketing rents in Morningside Heights, prompted the construction of new dormitories at Columbia. Such a pressing need required a substantial expansion in housing space, and John Jay, the newest building for Columbia students, was built to nearly double the height of preexisting dormitories.

John Jay Hall was notably distinct from its institutional contemporaries on Morningside Heights. Johnson (now Wien) and Hewitt Halls were built to house female Columbia graduate students and Barnard College undergraduates, respectively. Both employed lighter wood finishing and "early-American" neo-colonial architecture, thought to reflect the comfortable, domestic environment women ought to be exposed to. In contrast, John Jay Hall featured dark wooden ceiling beams and panelling, as well as other details thought to render it a more "masculine" structure.

In his 1919 annual report, University President Nicholas Murray Butler wrote that the new dorm would "make provision for student life and student organizations which are so important a part of the total educational influence that the university, and particularly the College, exerts." Originally known simply as Students Hall, the building therefore incorporated features, such as the dining hall and rathskeller (the Lion's Den Grill, now JJ's Place), as well as student club space on the fourth floor, meant to foster on-campus student life. It rapidly became the center of undergraduate life, housing the offices of campus publications such as the Jester and the Columbia Daily Spectator. As humanist writer and Trappist monk Thomas Merton wrote of his Columbia experiences in The Seven Storey Mountain, "The fourth floor of John Jay Hall was the place where all the offices of the student publications, the Glee Club and the Student Board and all the rest were to be found. It was the noisiest and most agitated part of campus." John Jay also came to house dances, alumni receptions, and the holiday Yule Log lighting ceremony.

The first residents of what the New York Times had deemed the "Skyscraper Dorm", however, were agitated by its unreliable elevator service. Their irritation was expressed in a Times story headlined "Stair-climbing Stirs Columbia Students". Graffiti on one elevator noted "a fellow dropped dead from old age waiting for this elevator". Elevator service in the building remains faulty to this day.

USS John Jay
During the Second World War, John Jay served as quarters for U.S. Navy midshipmen and was run, for training purposes, as if it were a naval ship, referred to as the "USS John Jay". When midshipman desired to enter the building, he would have to say to their superiors "request your permission to come aboard, sir".

1967 Protest
John Jay Hall was the site of violent anti-Vietnam War protest led by the vice-chairman of the Columbia University Chapter of the SDS, Ted Gold. Over 300 protesters followed Gold into the lobby of John Jay, where they confronted the recruiting efforts the U.S. Marines had mounted there. After the protesters came under attack by right-wing students, Gold urged a retreat in order to avoid further conflict. After regrouping at the West End bar near campus, sociology professor and SDS professor Vernon Dibble invoked the skirmish inside the building to rally the dejected students. "You let them push you out of John Jay Hall today. You have to go back there again tomorrow to keep your credibility as a radical student group," he insisted.

The scuffle in John Jay Hall induced university President Grayson L. Kirk to issue a statement of new school policy: "Picketing or demonstrations may not be conducted within any University Building." Nevertheless, the 1967 events in John Jay were merely the precursor to the much larger crisis surrounding the protests of 1968, in which many other buildings, notably Hamilton Hall, were occupied by striking students.

Renovations 
In March 2022, the student lounge of John Jay was renamed after Walter and Shirley Wang, son and daughter-in-law of Taiwanese business magnate Wang Yung-ching, following the two's $10 million donation to improve undergraduate social spaces on campus.

Notable residents
Federico García Lorca (1929–1930), Spanish poet, wrote that “my room in John Jay is wonderful. It is on the 12th floor of the dormitory, and I can see all the university buildings, the Hudson River and a distant vista of white and pink skyscrapers. On the right, spanning the horizon, is a great bridge under construction, of incredible grace and strength.”
John Berryman, Pulitzer Prize-winning poet; once reported that he was knocked cold by a bottle that was tossed in through an open John Jay window.
David Paterson, Governor of New York
Julia Stiles (2000–2001), actress, starred in Save the Last Dance and Mona Lisa Smile
Max Minghella (2005–2006), actor, starred in Syriana and Art School Confidential
Spencer Treat Clark (2006–2007), actor, starred in Gladiator, Mystic River, and Unbreakable.
Jake Gyllenhaal (1998–9), actor, known for his work in Donnie Darko, Brokeback Mountain, Zodiac, and Nightcrawler.
Joseph Gordon-Levitt, actor, known for his work in The Walk, Inception, Snowden
Katori Hall, American playwright and winner of the Pulitzer Prize for Drama in 2021
Sha Na Na (1963–8), rock group. Co-founders George Leonard (1963–7) and Robert Leonard (1967–68), singer/composer Scott Simon (1966–67), and manager Ed Goodgold (1964–65) all resided in John Jay.
Jim McMillian (1965–1966), Los Angeles Lakers star, replaced Elgin Baylor at forward, led Lakers to 33 game win streak and NBA championship (avg 19.1/ game in playoffs).
Punch Sulzberger, publisher of The New York Times
Philip Springer, American composer known for writing the song Santa Baby
Cristina Teuscher, Olympic swimmer and gold medalist
Victor Cha, American presidential advisor and Korea specialist
John D'Emilio, professor of women's and gender studies at University of Illinois Chicago
Fiona Sze-Lorrain, poet
Raamla Mohamed, television writer
Thomas Lippman, journalist specializing in the Middle East
Tom Kitt, Pulitzer Prize-winning composer and musician

References

External links
John Jay Hall at Columbia Housing
Photo Tour of John Jay Hall
Housing the Columbia Community, lecture by Professor Andrew S. Dolkart on October 5, 1999
Home on the Heights: 100 Years of Housing at Columbia by Michael Foss, Columbia College Today, September 2005
WikiCu: John Jay Hall

Columbia University dormitories
University and college dormitories in the United States
McKim, Mead & White buildings
Residential buildings completed in 1927
Residential skyscrapers in Manhattan
Residential buildings in Manhattan
1927 establishments in New York (state)